The following lists events in the year 2016 in Israel.

Incumbents
 President – Reuven Rivlin
 Prime Minister – Benjamin Netanyahu
 Government of Israel – 34th government of Israel
 President of the Supreme Court – Miriam Naor
 Chief of General Staff – Gadi Eizenkot

Events

January
 January 1 – Tel Aviv shooting

February
 February 12-21 – Israel sent 2 athletes to the 2016 Winter Youth Olympics

March
 March 8 - Tel Aviv stabbings
 March 23 – Yisrael Beitenu formally joins the Thirty-fourth government of Israel
 March 24 – Hebron shooting incident

May
 14 May – Hovi Star represents Israel at the Eurovision Song Contest with the song “Made of Stars”.
 May 27 – First ever Miss Trans Israel

June
 June 8 – Tel Aviv shooting

July
 June 6-10 – Israel sent 17 athletes to the 2016 European Athletics Championships
 June 28-August 6 – Israel men's national lacrosse team competed in the 2016 European Lacrosse Championship, winning the silver medal.

August
 August 5–21 – 47 athletes from Israel competed at the 2016 Summer Olympics in Rio de Janeiro, Brazil
 August 29 - Opening of the Migdal HaEmek – Kfar Baruch Railway Station

September
 September 1 – AMOS 6 satellite is destroyed during launch testing
 September 2-4 - Israel national American football team competed in the European Championship of American football for the first time, losing both of their games
 September 7-18 - Israel sent 33 athletes to compete in the 2016 Summer Paralympics
 September 13 – Ofek 11 satellite launches from Palmachim Airbase
 September 23 - Israel qualified for the 2017 World Baseball Classic

November
November 22 – November 2016 Israel wildfires

December
December 12 – Israel received its first pair of F-35 Lightning II from the United States.

Deaths
 February 13 – Avigdor Ben-Gal, general (b. 1936)
 March 17 – Meir Dagan, army officer and Mossad Director-General. (b. 1945)
 August 28 – Binyamin Ben-Eliezer, general and politician (b. 1936)
 September 28 – Shimon Peres, Former Prime Minister of Israel (b. 1923)

See also
 Israel at the 2016 Summer Olympics
 Timeline of the Israeli–Palestinian conflict in 2016

References

 
2010s in Israel
Israel
Israel
Years of the 21st century in Israel